Abdulellah Al-Fadhl (born 26 March 1992) is a professional football player who most recently played for Al-Kawkab as a midfielder.

References

External links
 

1992 births
Living people
Saudi Arabian footballers
Al Hilal SFC players
Najran SC players
Al-Shoulla FC players
Al Jeel Club players
Al-Bukayriyah FC players
Al-Thoqbah Club players
Al-Sadd FC (Saudi football club) players
Al-Anwar Club players
Al-Kawkab FC players
Saudi Second Division players
Saudi First Division League players
Saudi Professional League players
Saudi Third Division players
Association football midfielders
Saudi Arabian Shia Muslims